Robin Elizabeth Hudson (born February 20, 1952) is an American jurist who served as an associate justice of the North Carolina Supreme Court.

Early life and education
Born in DeKalb County, Georgia, after studying philosophy and psychology at Yale University, Hudson earned a J.D. degree from the University of North Carolina at Chapel Hill in 1976.

Career
Except for three years as a state appellate defender, Hudson worked in private practice in Raleigh and Durham, North Carolina until 2000, when she was elected to the North Carolina Court of Appeals—the first woman to be elected to an appellate court in North Carolina without being appointed first. She is married and has two children, Emily and Charles.

Hudson was elected to the North Carolina Supreme Court seat of retiring Justice George Wainwright in November 2006. She took office in January 2007. Hudson was re-elected to the Court in November 2014. She chose not to run for another term in 2022, as she would have reached the state's mandatory retirement age about 13 months into that term.

In 2009, Hudson became president of the Women's Forum of North Carolina.

Hudson wrote the Supreme Court's 2022 opinion striking down the state legislature's congressional and legislative districts as excessively partisan gerrymanders.

References

External links
 Official biography
 News & Observer biography
 NC State Supreme Court Campaign Website

1952 births
21st-century American judges
21st-century American women judges
Justices of the North Carolina Supreme Court
Living people
North Carolina Court of Appeals judges
North Carolina Democrats
People from DeKalb County, Georgia
University of North Carolina School of Law alumni
Yale University alumni